Clarks Logan City Bus Service is an Australian operator of bus services in the southern suburbs of Brisbane. It operates 28 services under contract to the Government of Queensland under the TransLink banner.

In 2008, Graham Davis became the CEO of Clarks Logan City Bus Service.

In April 2016, the operator celebrated its 40th anniversary.

History
Clark's Bus Service was formed in 1976 when couple Yvonne and Reg Clark started a local school bus service in Logan City. In 1987, Clark's Bus Service purchased Greenline Bus Service in an effort to expand services to Brisbane City. In September 1995, Rochedale Bus Service was purchased. In 2003, it was rebranded as Clarks Logan City Bus Service.

Fleet
As of May 2021, the fleet consists of 127 highly standardised vehicles. These consist mostly of the Volvo B12BLE chassis mounted with a VST body manufactured by Bustech.

In July 2017, Clarks Logan City Bus Service launched the new 567 route, servicing between the suburbs of Holmview and Beenleigh. This route is served by the first operational Hino Poncho outside Japan.

References

External links
Translink timetables
Showbus gallery
	

Bus companies of Queensland
Public transport in Brisbane
Translink (Queensland)
Logan City
1976 establishments in Australia
Companies established in 1976